Andrei Churyla (born 19 May 1993) is a Belarusian high jumper.

He participated in the high jump at the 2010 Summer Youth Olympics, finishing fourth. At the 2012 World Junior Championships in Athletics in Barcelona, he won a gold medal.

References

External links

1993 births
Living people
Belarusian male high jumpers
Athletes (track and field) at the 2010 Summer Youth Olympics
Athletes (track and field) at the 2012 Summer Olympics
Athletes (track and field) at the 2016 Summer Olympics
Olympic athletes of Belarus
People from Baranavichy
Sportspeople from Brest Region